J.R.C. Hr. Sec School is a school near Aruvankattuvalasu, Kothayam, Oddanchatram Taluk, which was started in 1991 for the welfare of nearby villages. It offers Education from 6th standard to 12th Standard both in Tamil and English Medium.

See also
Dindigul district
  Palani Murugan Temple
Places of Interest in Dindigul district
 Oddanchatram Vegetable Market
Kodaikanal

References
 Dindigul District

High schools and secondary schools in Tamil Nadu
Education in Dindigul district
Educational institutions established in 1991
1991 establishments in Tamil Nadu